The Essex and Kent Scottish is a Primary Reserve infantry regiment of the Canadian Army.

The regiment was formed in 1954 by the amalgamation of The Essex Scottish Regiment and The Kent Regiment.

Its colonel-in-chief is Prince Michael of Kent. The current commanding officer is Lieutenant-Colonel Gord Prentice (from Sep 2019). The regimental sergeant major is CWO Jeremy Clark.

There are two standing platoons within the regiment: 1 Platoon based in Windsor, Ontario; and 2 Platoon, based in Chatham-Kent, Ontario.

Lineage

The Essex Scottish Regiment

On June 12, 1885, The Essex Scottish Regiment was created as a part of the Canadian militia, then named The 21st Essex Battalion of Infantry. It would be composed of five infantry companies, which were formed between the years 1860 and 1885 in Essex County.  Major John Richardson of Leamington Ontario was the first commanding officers of this regiment. It is from this date that the unbroken lineage of Essex and Kent Scottish Regiment begins.

Throughout the next few decades the name of this regiment would change several times. On 4 February 1887 the regiment was renamed the 21st battalion Essex Fusiliers.  Three years later the name was changed again to the 21st Regiment Essex Fusiliers on 8 May 1900. The final name for this regiment would be the Essex Scottish regiment which took effect 15 July 1927.

Prior to the First World War the regiment as a whole did not see combat. Although it did not see any real action they trained very hard to go to war during the Louis Riel rebellion in 1885, and also sent several troops to Africa during the Boer war in 1900. Over 100 troops from the 21st Battalion Essex Fusiliers volunteered to serve in Africa only 16 positions were given to the regiment. This small group of men were to serve with the 2nd Special Service Battalion of the Royal Canadian Regiment of Infantry. Of the sixteen men sent to Africa two did not return.

The Kent Regiment

The regiment in Kent County was known as the 24th Kent Regiment, prior to 1901 this regiment had been created and disbanded several times. It was not until 1 January 1901 with the increasing number of troops being sent to Africa to fight in the Boer War that the regiment was created permanently, with its headquarters in Chatham, Ontario. They had seven men fight in the Boer War and one did not return.  Like the Essex Fusiliers, the Kent Regiment was also renamed several times. In December 1936, the regiment was re-designated as The Kent Regiment (MG), which meant it was now a machine gun regiment not a light infantry regiment. Eventually it was named The Kent Regiment on 1 April 1941.

Chart

Perpetuations

War of 1812 
The Essex and Kent Scottish perpetuate the following units:
 1st and 2nd Regiments of the Essex Militia
 the 1st Regiment of the Kent Militia
 the Loyal Kent Volunteers
 the Loyal Essex Volunteers (Essex Rangers) 
 the Western Rangers (Caldwell's Rangers). 
Further discussion of perpetuated units see: Canadian Units of the War of 1812

World War I 
The Essex and Kent Scottish perpetuate the following units:
 18th Battalion (Western Ontario), CEF
 99th (Essex) Battalion, CEF
 186th (Kent) Battalion, CEF
 241st Battalion (Canadian Scottish Borderers), CEF.

History

World War 1
During the Great War details of the 21st Regiment Essex Fusiliers and 24th Kent Regiment, which included hundreds of men, were placed on active service on 6 August 1914 for local protection duties.

The 18th Battalion (Western Ontario), CEF was authorized on 7 November 1914 and embarked for Great Britain on 18 April 1915 and arrived in France on 15 September 1915. The battalion fought as part of the 4th Infantry Brigade, 2nd Canadian Division in France and Flanders until the end of the war and was disbanded on 15 September 1920.

The 99th Battalion was authorized on 22 December 1915 and embarked for Great Britain on 31 May 1916 where its personnel were absorbed by the '35th Reserve Battalion, CEF' to provide reinforcements to the Canadian Corps in the field on 6 July 1916. The battalion was disbanded on 1 September 1917.

The 186th Battalion was authorized on 15 July 1916 and embarked for Great Britain on 28 March 1917 where on 7 April 1917, its personnel were absorbed by the 4th Reserve Battalion, CEF, to provide reinforcements to the Canadian Corps in the field, with the battalion sisbanding on 15 September 1917.

The 241st Battalion was authorized on 15 July 1916 and embarked for Great Britain on 29 April 1917 where on 7 May 1917 its personnel were absorbed by the 5th Reserve Battalion, CEF, to provide reinforcements to the Canadian Corps in the field. The battalion disbanded on 1 September 1917.

The timeline for these battalions are as follows; Canada: October 1, 1914 - April 18, 1915, England: April 29, 1915 - September 14, 1915, France: September 15, 1915 - April 3, 1919, Canada: returned May 14, 1919. Some of the major battles these battalions took part in were; Ypres 1915, 1917; Festubert 1915; Mount Sorrel; Somme 1916; Flers Courcelette; Thiepval; Ancre Heights; Arras 1917; Vimy 1917; Hill 70: Passchendaele;  Amiens; Scarpe 1918; Hindenburg Line; Canal du Nord;  Cambrai 1918; Pursuit to Mons; France and Flanders 1915-1918

World War 2
During the Second World War, The Essex Scottish mobilized the Essex Scottish Regiment, CASF, for active service on 1 September 1939. It embarked for Great Britain on 16 July 1940 and was re-designated the 1st Battalion, The Essex Scottish Regiment, CASF, on 7 November 1940.

The battalion took part in the raid on Dieppe on 19 August 1942. The Essex Scottish Regiment left France for the attack with 553 men all ranks. At the end of the battle the Essex Scottish had suffered 530 casualties including 6 officers and 108 other ranks killed, the rest being taken prisoner. After the battle the Essex Scottish spent a lot of time rebuilding the regiment so they could continue fighting throughout the war.

The unit returned to France on 5 July 1944, as part of the 4th Infantry Brigade, 2nd Canadian Infantry Division. They moved to Normandy in time to serve with the British 2nd Army. It then participated in the advance along the Channel coast with the Canadian 1st Army including the liberation of Dieppe. The division saw heavy action in the Netherlands in late 1944 and took part in the final offensives in 1945.  Some of the engagements the Essex Scottish were a part of were; Bourguebus Ridge; St. André-sur-Orne;  Falaise; Falaise Roa; Clair Tizon; Forêt de la Londe; The Scheldt; Woensdrecht; South Beveland; The Rhineland; Goch-Calcar Road; The Hochwald; Xanten; Twente Canal; Groningen; Oldenburg; North-West Europe 1942, 1944-1945.

The Kent Regiment (Machine Gun) mobilized The Kent Regiment, CASF, for active service on 24 May 1940 and was re-designated the 1st Battalion, The Kent Regiment, CASF, on 7 November 1940. It served in Canada as part of the 14th Infantry Brigade, 8th Canadian Infantry Division, which was part of Pacific Command. The battalion was disbanded on 30 March 1946.

Modern conflicts 
Today the Essex and Kent Scottish Regiment remains an active service unit in the Canadian army. It has sent many of its troops on United Nations peacekeeping missions, as well as over forty members to the recent conflict in Afghanistan. Members have also seen deployments to Lebanon (OP JADE), Ukraine (OP UNIFIER), Poland and Latvia (OP RESSURANCE).

The forming of The Essex and Kent Scottish Regiment
On 8 July 1954 while the Essex Scottish Regiment and the Kent Regiment were on a training exercise in Niagara on the Lake the two units found out that they were going to be joined as one unit.  However it would not become official until 1 October 1954 and The Essex and Kent Scottish Regiment was formed. The Essex and Kent Scottish Regiment were to have two battalions. The 1st Battalions Headquarters was in Windsor, while 2nd Battalion was stationed in Chatham. In 1964, The Canadian Forces Headquarters decided to make certain reductions and amalgamations within the Canadian Military structure. Many units in the Province of Ontario were affected by this decision, including The Essex and Kent Scottish Regiment. So, following new orders and protocol, the two battalions of the regiment amalgamated on March 31, 1965. This is the current structure of the regiment.
When the two units first amalgamated there were several small issues which had to be resolved. First of all there were too many members in the unit by one full company. This meant that several of the officers and senior NCOs had to transfer to different units. One of the other problems was who would the commanding officer be for this new unit; however, it was soon made clear that even though the Kent Regiment had several qualified officers all of the future Commanding officers would be from Windsor because that is where the Regimental HQ would be located. One major event that happened in the first few years form the newly formed Essex and Kent Scottish Regiment which helped bring the two units together was the trooping of their first colours. This happened in Jackson Park in Windsor Ontario on 5 June 1955.

Alliances 
 - The Princess of Wales's Royal Regiment (Queen's and Royal Hampshires)
 - The Royal Anglian Regiment

Battle honours
In the list below, battle honours in small capitals were awarded for participation in large operations and campaigns, while those in lowercase indicate honours granted for more specific battles. Battle honours in bold type are emblazoned on the regimental colour.

War of 1812

The non-emblazonable honorary distinction

The Great War

The Second World War

War in Afghanistan

Victoria Cross recipients
 L/Sgt Ellis Wellwood Sifton
 Major Frederick Albert Tilston

Cadets
There are four Cadet Corps affiliated to the regiment
 59 Legion Highlander Royal Canadian Army Cadet Corps (Chatham-Kent, Ontario)
 1086 Walkerville Army Cadet Corps (Windsor, Ontario)
 2715 Metropolitan Legion Royal Canadian Army Cadet Corps (Windsor, Ontario)
2918 South Essex Scottish Royal Canadian Army Cadet Corps (Kingsville, Ontario)

Armouries

See also 

 Canadian-Scottish regiment

Notes

References

 Barnes, RM, The Uniforms and History of the Scottish Regiments, London, Sphere Books Limited, 1972.

Essex and Kent Scottish
Infantry regiments of Canada
Highland & Scottish regiments of Canada
Scottish regiments
Military units and formations of Ontario
Organizations based in Windsor, Ontario
Chatham-Kent
Military units and formations established in 1954
Infantry regiments of Canada in World War II